Allameh Abul Hasan Sharani  (b. 1902 - d.1973), known as 'Allama Sha'rani, was a Shi'a scholar and philosopher in the 20th century. he was an Iranian philosopher, teacher, author, jurist and Islamic theologian.He knew French and English, and was an expert in Quranic studies, hadith, fiqh, usul al-fiqh, kalam (Islamic theology) .Thus he wrote many works in these areas. 

His books include Falsafi ula, which concerns the views of western philosophers about metaphysics and the immateriality of the soul, and Rah-i sa'adat, which is an argument for prophecy and in particular, the prophecy of the Prophet Muhammad. 

Sharani was a prominent member of the philosophical school of Tehran.

Family

Ayatollah Hajj Mirza Abul Hasan Sharani (1902-1975) was born in Tehran . He was the son of Hajj Sheykh Muhammad. Sharani was the grandson of Abul Hasan Mujtahed Tehrani and Mulla Fathollah. 

Sharani had four sons and four daughters. 

He is buried near Shah Abdul Azim Hasani.

Teachers

 Sheykh Muhammad
 Mirza Ali Akbar Khan Yazdi
 Mirza Mahmoud Qommi, 
 Sheykh Abdun Nabi Nouri
 Sayyed Hasan Modarres
 Mirza Taher Tonekaboni
 Mulla Muhammad Hidaji 
 Sheykh Aqa Bozorg Tehrani 
 Mirza Mehdi Ashtiani 
 Sheykh Abdul Karim Yazdi (the Founder of the Hawzeh of Qom),
 Sayyed Abutorab Khansari

Pupils

 Mirza Hashem Amoli
 Hajj Mirza Ali Akbar Ghaffari
 Sheykh Ali Asqar Karbaschian (the founder of Alavi High school) 
 Ayatollah Hasan Hasanzadeh Amoli
 Ayatollah Javadi Amoli
 Ayatollah Sayyed Razi Shirazi
 Mirza Ali Aqa Shahcheraghi
 Dr Mehdi Mohaqeq
 Dr Muhammad Khansari

Career

Sharani taught in Sepahsalar School and Marvi School. He taught as a full professor in the faculty of literature of Tehran University. He was also the Imam of the Houz Mosque.

Sharani was fluent in French, Arabic and Persian.

Works

 Sharani wrote books on jurisprudence, theology, philosophy and Hadith. Allameh Sharani translated many valuable books such as Nafas Al Mahmoum and Sahifeh Sajjadiah from Arabic to Persian.
 Commentary notes on the book al-Wafi of Mulla Muhsen Feyz Kashani, in 3 vols
 Notes on the book al-Kafi in 12 vols 
 Notes On Majma al Bayan, a Qur'an commentary in 10 vols
 Corrections and notes on the book Safi, a Qur'an commentary in 2 vols 
 Notes on Manhaj Assadeqqin in 10 vols
 Explaining the book of Tajrid al Eteqad (Abstraction of opinions) 
 Preface and notes on Asrar Al Hikam (the mysteries of Wisdom)
 Philosophical Idioms
 Translation of Flamarion to French

Sources

 The biography and Scientific and cultural services of Allameh Mirza Abul hasan sharani. The council of works and Great Scientists Human. Iran. Tehran. 2005
 Nafas al Mahmoum, translated by Ayatollah shrani, Noore Mataf, Qom, 2009
 Akbar Sobout,The Narration of Knowing and Teaching, in The biogroghy and Scientific and cultural services of Allameh Mirza Abul hasan sharani. The council of works and Great Scientists Human. Iran. Tehran. 2005
 Qavvami Vaez, Allameh the great person in The biogroghy and Scientific and cultural services of Allameh Mirza Abul hasan sharani. The council of works and Great Scientists Human. Iran. Tehran. 2005

References

http://www.wikifeqh.ir/%D8%B9%D9%84%D8%A7%D9%85%D9%87_%D8%B4%D8%B9%D8%B1%D8%A7%D9%86%DB%8C
http://www.hawzah.net/fa/magazine/magart/89/3552/16608
http://mtif.org/p/person/43239/علامه-ابوالحسن-شعرانی

1902 births
1975 deaths
Muslim scholars of Islamic jurisprudence